The Absecon Public School District is a comprehensive community public school district that serves students in pre-kindergarten through eighth grade from Absecon, in Atlantic County, New Jersey, United States.

As of the 2021–22 school year, the district, comprised of two schools, had an enrollment of 906 students and 87.0 classroom teachers (on an FTE basis), for a student–teacher ratio of 10.4:1.

The district is classified by the New Jersey Department of Education as being in District Factor Group "CD", the sixth-highest of eight groupings. District Factor Groups organize districts statewide to allow comparison by common socioeconomic characteristics of the local districts. From lowest socioeconomic status to highest, the categories are A, B, CD, DE, FG, GH, I and J.

For ninth through twelfth grades, public school students from Absecon attend the Pleasantville High School in Pleasantville as part of a sending/receiving relationship with the Pleasantville Public Schools. As of the 2021–22 school year, the high school had an enrollment of 893 students and 72.5 classroom teachers (on an FTE basis), for a student–teacher ratio of 12.3:1. Students are also eligible to attend the Atlantic County Institute of Technology and Charter-Tech High School for the Performing Arts.

A 2019 study looked at the possibility of dissolving the sending relationship with Pleasantville. The consultants considered a shift to either Mainland Regional High School or the Greater Egg Harbor Regional High School District (at either Absegami High School or Cedar Creek High School). The study concluded that Absegami High School was the preferred alternative and that the district would achieve significant savings from lower costs per student. In 2020, Absecon district submitted a petition to end its agreement with Pleasantville and send its students to Absegami High School under a new sending/receiving relationship with the Greater Egg Harbor Regional High School District that Absecon argues would give its students a better education at a lower cost, without negatively impacting the demographics in Pleasantville High School. About 10% of Absecon's graduating students have been choosing to attend Pleasantville High School, for which the Absecon district has been paying $18,000 per student each year. In May 2022, the Acting State Commissioner of the New Jersey Department of Education rejected the petition, citing the impact that the departure of Absecon's students would have on the racial balance at Pleasantville High School.

Schools
Schools in the district (with 2021–22 enrollment data from the National Center for Education Statistics.) are:
Elementary school
H. Ashton Marsh Elementary School with 513 students in grades PreK-4
Leslie Satt, Principal
Middle school
Emma C. Attales Middle School with 387 students in grades 5-8
Kevin Burns, Principal

Administration
Core members of the district's administration are:
Dr. Daniel J. Dooley, Superintendent of Schools
Allyson Milazzo, Business Administrator / Board Secretary

Board of education
The district's board of education is comprised of seven members who set policy and oversee the fiscal and educational operation of the district through its administration. As a Type II school district, the board's trustees are elected directly by voters to serve three-year terms of office on a staggered basis, with either two or three seats up for election each year held (since 2012) as part of the November general election. The board appoints a superintendent to oversee the district's day-to-day operations and a business administrator to supervise the business functions of the district.

References

External links
Absecon Public School District Website

School Data for the Absecon Public Schools, National Center for Education Statistics

Absecon, New Jersey
New Jersey District Factor Group CD
School districts in Atlantic County, New Jersey